Christian Blain (born 31 July 1948) is a French racing cyclist. He rode in the 1973 Tour de France.

References

1948 births
Living people
French male cyclists
Place of birth missing (living people)